Carrier Airborne Early Warning Squadron 77 (VAW-77) "Nightwolves" was an aviation unit of the United States Navy Reserve based at Naval Air Station Joint Reserve Base New Orleans from 1995 to 2013. It comprised the U.S. Navy's only fully dedicated counter-narcotics squadron.

Squadron History

VAW-77's beginnings go back to 1995 when the U.S. Congress created the reserve squadron as a result of the United States escalating war on illegal drug trafficking. VAW-77 received four specially modified E-2C Hawkeye airborne early warning aircraft optimized for counter-drug missions. As part of the Navy's post-Cold War role, VAW-77 flight crews patrolled the waters of the Caribbean in joint missions with the United States Coast Guard and other drug enforcement agencies in search of illegal aircraft and ships.

1990s 
On 18 November 1995, VAW-77 was commissioned, as a Reserve Squadron serving with the US Coast Guard and other Federal Agencies to fight the war on drugs, providing sophisticated air surveillance on traffic off the southern coast of the United States. The squadron worked in tandem with Coast Guard and other federal law enforcement agencies to combine and coordinate operations of counter-narcotics forces. The E-2C Hawkeye squadron deploys four to five times a year to bases near known drug trafficking routes to help identify suspected drug smugglers. The squadron spends approximately four to five months per year forward deployed to bases near illegal drug traffic lanes.

After Hurricane Floyd hit in late 1999,  VAW-77 and VAW-78 provided communication, command and control (C3) support to U.S. Coast Guard, Air Force, Army aircraft, and C-130 for humanitarian relief and flood evacuation operations in Virginia, North and South Carolina. When flooding began in Virginia and North Carolina near the Tar River, VAW-77 and VAW-78 initially supported Search and Rescue operations over the drill weekend.

2000s 
Since commissioning, the Nightwolves have completed a number of sixty-day counter-drug deployments to the Caribbean Theater. VAW-77 deployed primarily to NS Roosevelt Roads until the Naval Station ceased active operations in October 2003 prior to its inactivation on March 31, 2004. VAW-77 continues to operate out of Howard AFB, Patrick AFB, Comalapa AFB, Coast Guard Air Station Borinquen,  Manta Air Force Base, and Hato International Airport. Squadron aircraft have been involved in over 120 high profile arrests and seizures of drug carrying container ships, high-speed watercraft, and light civilian aircraft. In fact, the mere presence of the Nightwolves in the Caribbean has caused drug traffickers to change their tactics in order to avoid detection by VAW-77 aircraft.

In 2005 the squadron participated in the federal military response to Katrina in 2005.

In August 2008, VAW-77 moved to its new home of NAS JRB New Orleans in response to BRAC's decision to close Naval Air Station Atlanta.

2010s 
The squadron was the first U.S. Navy fixed-wing squadron to deploy to Colombia in 2011, also in 2012, it had a role in disrupting the flow of $735 million in illegal drugs into the U.S. and the arrest of 17 international smugglers.

Because of spending cuts throughout the Department of Defense, the unit was recommended for deactivation by the Secretary of the Navy. In February 2013, the Nightwolves were formally disbanded, and its crew & equipment were in the process of being redistributed throughout other naval squadrons. VAW-77 was deactivated on 9 March 2013. The squadron's six aircraft were transferred to other carrier airborne warning squadrons and the squadron members were transfer to various other Commander Naval Air Force Reserve (CNAFR) squadrons.

Unit Citations

The squadron's other awards include a Joint Meritorious Unit Award, Navy Meritorious Unit Commendation, Coast Guard Meritorious Unit Commendation, two Battle "E" awards, the Safety "S" and numerous Bravo Zulu's and unit citations.

See also
 History of the United States Navy
 List of United States Navy aircraft squadrons

References

External links
 VAW-77 - Global Security Global Security.org.

Military units and formations in Georgia (U.S. state)
Early warning squadrons of the United States Navy